North America is a miniseries that aired on the Discovery Channel. It premiered on May 19, 2013. It ran for seven episodes, and ended on June 16, 2013.

The series includes the topics of nature and its beauty on the continent of North America.

The series is the first natural history landmark series on the Discovery Channel that is internally produced. The series has also been aired on Animal Planet.

Cast
The series is narrated by Tom Selleck.

Production
The footage in North America was taken from environments throughout the continent, mainly from Canada, the United States, and Central America. Filming took three years.

Episodes

Reception

Critical reception
North America received a 71 out of 100 from Metacritic, indicating generally positive reviews.

Robert Lloyd of the Los Angeles Times stated that the special effects were "corny" at times; however, he commended the filming, stating that the documentary was "gorgeous from first to last."

After viewing the first episode, Television Blends Kelly West stated "North America dazzle[s] us with beautiful landscape views of different locations across the continent" and that it is "an educational experience as we witness North American wildlife in all its natural glory."

Ratings
North America premiered to a 1.0 rating in the Adults 18-49 demographic and 3.443 million overall viewers. It ended at about half of its premiere totals in both, with a 0.5 rating and 1.64 million viewers.

1 – Separate ratings for episodes 1 and 2, which aired adjacent to each other, were not released.

International distribution
In the United Kingdom, North America airs on the Discovery Channel. In the British version, the voice-over was re-dubbed and spoken by Chiwetel Ejiofor.

In Canada, the series airs on the Discovery Channel. In The Netherlands, the series airs on the Discovery Channel and is narrated by Rutger Hauer.

In Brazil, the series airs on the Discovery Channel and is narrated by Brazilian singer Seu Jorge.

References

External links

North America at TV by the Numbers

2010s American television miniseries
2013 American television series debuts
2013 American television series endings
English-language television shows
Discovery Channel original programming